Juan Téllez-Girón, 2nd Count of Ureña (in full) (c. 1456 – 21 May 1528) was a Spanish nobleman.

Juan Téllez-Girón was the third natural son of Pedro Girón, 1st Lord of Osuna and of Inés de las Casas. The children were legitimated by Papal bull on March 1466, confirmed by King Henry IV of Castile.  He succeeded to the titles of his older brother in 1469. He married Leonor de la Vega Velasco, daughter of Pedro Fernández de Velasco, 2nd Count of Haro, with whom he had 15 children.

Sources

1456 births
1528 deaths
102
Juan
Juan